František Raboň (born 26 September 1983) is a Czech mountain biker for the Specialized Racing Factory Mountain Bike Team.

Born in Prague, Raboň turned professional in 2006 with German outfit , after having been European road champion the previous season and 3 times Czech Under 23 time trial and one time road race champion.

For the 2014 season, Raboň moved into mountain biking with the Specialized Racing Factory Mountain Bike Team.

Palmares

2003
 1st Stage 5 Bałtyk–Karkonosze Tour
2004
 1st Stage 9 Tour du Maroc
 1st Stage 4 Tour de Slovaquie
 6th GP Palma
 7th Overall Bałtyk–Karkonosze Tour
2005
 1st European Under-23 Road Race Championships
 1st Memorial Andrzeja Trochnowskiego
 1st Stage 4a (ITT) Tour de Slovaquie
 2nd GP Kooperativa
 3rd Overall Course de la Solidarité Olympique
 3rd Porec Trophy
 4th Overall Paths of King Nikola
1st Stage 3
 4th Overall Bałtyk–Karkonosze Tour
 5th GP Palma
 8th Overall Tour of Małopolska
1st Stage 1
2006
 3rd National Time Trial Championships
2008
 1st  National Time Trial Championships
 1st Stage 5 Tour of Ireland
 3rd Praha–Karlovy Vary–Praha
 6th Overall Danmark Rundt
 8th Hel van het Mergelland
2009
 1st  National Time Trial Championships
 Tour de Romandie
1st Prologue (ITT) & Stage 3 (TTT)
 1st Stage 3 (ITT) Vuelta Ciclista a Murcia
 2nd Overall Critérium International
2010
 1st  National Time Trial Championships
 1st Overall Vuelta Ciclista a Murcia
1st Stage 4 (ITT)
 7th Overall Volta ao Algarve
2012
 1st Stage 2b (TTT) Tour de l'Ain
 2nd National Road Race Championships
 3rd National Time Trial Championships
2013
 4th Tour Bohemia
 9th Overall Driedaagse van West-Vlaanderen

References

External links

Czech male cyclists
Sportspeople from Prague
1983 births
Living people
Cape Epic cyclists